"There once was a man from Nantucket" is the opening line for many limericks, in which the name of the island of Nantucket creates often ribald rhymes and puns. The protagonist in the obscene versions is typically portrayed as well-endowed and hypersexualized. The opening line is so well known that it has been used as a stand-alone joke, implying upcoming obscenities.

History
The earliest published version appeared in 1879 in The Pearl, Volume 3 (September 1879 ):

Another early published version appeared in 1902 in the Princeton Tiger written by Prof. Dayton Voorhees:

Other publications seized upon the "Nantucket" motif, spawning many sequels.

Among the best-known are:

Followed later by:

Ribald versions
The many ribald versions of the limerick are the basis for its lasting popularity. Many variations on the theme are possible because of the ease of rhyming "Nantucket" with certain vulgar phrases.  The following example comes from Immortalia: An Anthology of American Ballads, Sailors' Songs, Cowboy Songs, College Songs, Parodies, Limericks, and Other Humorous Verses and Doggerel, published in 1927.

In popular culture

The poem has become a staple of American humor. It is often used as a joking example of fine art, with the vulgarity providing a surprising contrast to an expected refinement, such as in the 2002 film Solaris, when George Clooney's character mentions that his favorite poem is the most famous poem by Dylan Thomas that starts with "There was a young man from Nantucket" or Will & Grace season 8 episode 3 ("The Old Man and the Sea"), in which Grace criticizes her date's poem due to the lack of rhymes, and as an example, she recites the first two lines of the ribald version: "There once was a man from Nantucket... Something something something... Suck it."

Many jokes assume the audience knows the poem so well that they do not need to hear any actual lines to get the allusion, such as Gilmore Girls season 3 episode 8, when Lorelai Gilmore jokes about carving something dirty into a bathroom wall by saying "What rhymes with Nantucket?"; in "Who's the boss" season 5 episode 23, there is talk about poetry class and Tony says about Angela "...last time she heard her name mentioned in a poem, it started with "There once was a man from Nantucket"..."; in the Tiny Toon Adventures episode "Wheel O' Comedy" when Babs Bunny asks Buster Bunny to say the magic chant before spinning the wheel, to which Buster begins reciting: "There once was a girl from Nantucket..." before she quickly cuts him off with: "Not that chant!" or a sketch from Robot Chicken season 8 episode 19, when J. R. R. Tolkien, writing the opening of the book The Hobbit, comes up with the line, "In a hole of Middle-earth, there was found a Hobbit." The 2012 Gravity Falls episode "Headhunters" features the line, "There once was a dude from Kentucky..." Broadcast Standards and Practices requested that the line be changed from “There once was a man from Kentucky”, which retained the sentence structure of the original limerick, arguing that "unsavory rhymes could be gleaned from it."
In an episode of SpongeBob SquarePants however, SpongeBob was on a stage, about to recite an opera song, when he pulled out a piece of paper and said, "There once was a man from Nantucket," before the audience gasps, he puts the paper back into his pocket, and says "Oops, wrong one," and afterward continuing with his song.

References

External links
 Yesterday's Island "Limerick Challenge"

American poems
Humorous poems
Nantucket in fiction
American humor